Clinton Rhodes (born 23 September 1971) is a South African cricketer. He played in twelve first-class matches between 1990/91 and 1993/94.

See also
 List of Eastern Province representative cricketers

References

External links
 

1971 births
Living people
South African cricketers
Eastern Province cricketers
KwaZulu-Natal cricketers
Cricketers from Pietermaritzburg